Ferdinand Küchler (14 July 1867, in Giessen – 24 October 1937, in Leipzig) was a German violinist and violist, renowned violin pedagogue, and composer of instructive violin music.

Life and work
Küchler studied violin with Johann Naret-Koning and Hugo Heermann, and music theory with Arthur Egidi and Iwan Knorr from 1883 to 1888 at the Hoch Conservatory in Frankfurt am Main.  In 1889 he took his first job as principal violist of the Symphony Orchestra in Basel, also playing viola in a string quartet, and later began teaching violin at the local music school.  In 1898 he was appointed a violin teacher at the Hoch Conservatory in Frankfurt, and was also violist of the Heermann Quartet led by his former teacher.  Küchler returned to Basel in 1910.  The following year became director of a private music school and worked as a choral conductor. From 1927 to 1936 he taught violin at the Landeskonservatorium der Musik zu Leipzig (State Conservatory of Leipzig).

Küchler wrote textbooks on violin technique and composed instructive pieces for the violin including several student concertos.  His two-volume Course of Violin Instruction (published by Hug-Verlag, Zürich) was a cornerstone of the violin instructional literature until the mid-1960s.

Works
Sortable list of compositions, pedagogical works and literature categorized by genre, opus number, date of composition, titles and scoring.

Footnotes

External links
 

1867 births
1937 deaths
German classical violinists
Male classical violinists
German male violinists
German classical violists
German composers
Violin pedagogues